Docidava (Dokidava, Dakidawa?) was a Dacian town in north-western Roman Dacia.

See also 
 Dacian davae
 List of ancient cities in Thrace and Dacia
 Dacia
 Roman Dacia

References

Further reading 

 

Dacian towns